Mount Pleasant is a small village in the south of Merthyr Tydfil County Borough, Wales.

The village is also known as "The Black Lion" after the old signal box, controlling passenger and coal lines from Merthyr Vale Colliery to Cardiff on the Taff Vale Railway.

External links
Old Merthyr Tydfil: Mount Pleasant – Historical photographs

Villages in Merthyr Tydfil County Borough